The  Detroit Lions season was the franchise's 77th season in the National Football League, and their 83rd as the Detroit Lions.
The season began with the team trying to improve on their 5–11 record in 2005; however, they regressed and finished with a 3–13 record.

The Lions started the 2006 season losing their first five games and six of their first seven. The Lions would not recover, as they never got over .500 during the season. The Lions would only get two wins in their first 15 games, both home wins against the Buffalo Bills and Atlanta Falcons, who both finished with losing records. The Lions went 1–6 against teams that finished with a winning record. From weeks 10 to 16, the Lions embarked on a 7-game losing streak to sit at 2–13, but in week 17, the Lions conclude their season by stunning the Dallas Cowboys in Dallas 39–31 – a loss that cost the Cowboys the NFC East. The lowest point of the season came in their Thanksgiving Day game against the Miami Dolphins. During the game, "Fire Millen" signs, which were a part of the "Fire Millen" movement in association with Lions general manager Matt Millen, were seen in the stands for portions of the game. All the while, fans chanting “Fire Millen” were heard all over the stadium. The Dolphins won the game 27–10.

Offseason
On January 19, the Lions hired Rod Marinelli as the team’s new head coach. From the Tony Dungy “coaching tree”, Marinelli had previously served as the defensive line coach and assistant coach for the Tampa Bay Buccaneers. The new offensive coordinator, Mike Martz was brought in, and the following were selected in the NFL Draft – linebacker Ernie Sims out of Florida State University and safety Daniel Bullocks out of the University of Nebraska. The rest of their picks included Wisconsin RB Brian Calhoun, Texas OT Jonathan Scott, West Virginia CB Alton McCann, Southern California Guard Fred Matua, and Tulane LB Anthony Cannon.

NFL Draft

Final roster

Schedule

Preseason

Regular season

Standings

Regular season

Week 1: vs. Seattle Seahawks

at Ford Field, Detroit, Michigan

The Lions opened the regular season at home against the Seattle Seahawks on September 10. The Lions would score first on kicker Jason Hanson’s 44-yard field goal in the first quarter. However, in the second quarter, Seattle would get back in the game with kicker Josh Brown’s 20-yard and 51-yard field goals. After a scoreless third quarter, the Lions would tie in the fourth quarter with Hanson booting a 37-yard field goal, but Seattle got a last-second win with a 42-yard field goal in the closing seconds. With the season-opening loss, the Lions were 0–1.

Week 2: at Chicago Bears

at Soldier Field, Chicago, Illinois

The Lions played their first road game of the year, as in Week 2, they played an NFC North battle against the Chicago Bears. From the get-go, the Lions trailed, as they allowed 24 first half points. It came in the form of opposing QB Rex Grossman’s 3-yard TD pass to TE John Gilmore and opposing kicker Robbie Gould’s 32-yard field goal in the first quarter. It also came in the form of a 41-yard TD pass to WR Bernard Berrian and a 31-yard TD pass to TE Desmond Clark. The Lions only score of the game came in the form of QB Jon Kitna getting a 1-yard QB sneak for a TD in the third quarter. The Bears put the game well-out of reach, as a 5-yard TD to TE John Gilmore later in the quarter and a 45-yard field goal by Gould in the fourth quarter sealed Detroit’s fate. With the loss, the Lions dropped to 0–2.

Week 3: vs. Green Bay Packers

at Ford Field, Detroit, Michigan

Hoping to get win #1, the Lions returned home for an NFC North battle with the Green Bay Packers. The game started off with a close first quarter, as QB Brett Favre threw his 400th career touchdown pass, by completing a short pass to rookie WR Greg Jennings who took the ball 75 yards for a touchdown. Detroit would tie the game up as QB Jon Kitna completed a 37-yard TD pass to RB Shawn Bryson. Green Bay would take the lead again as DB Marquand Manuel returned an interception 29 yards for a touchdown, but the Lions would tie the game again as Kitna completed a 42-yard TD pass to WR Roy Williams as time ran out of the quarter. In the second quarter, however, the Packers retook the lead for the only score of the period, as kicker Dave Rayner booted a 24-yard field goal. In the third quarter, both sides shared a touchdown with each other. Green Bay got a 5-yard TD pass to WR Donald Driver and Detroit got a 5-yard TD run by RB Kevin Jones. In the fourth quarter, the Packers got some distance, as Favre completed a 4-yard TD pass to RB Ahman Green. The Lions would get a 40-yard field goal by kicker Jason Hanson, but that would be as close as Detroit would get, as they dropped yet another game for the 2006 season as the team fell to 0–3.

Week 4: at St. Louis Rams

at the Edward Jones Dome, St. Louis, Missouri

The Lions traveled to the Edward Jones Dome to take on the St. Louis Rams, where in this game, Lions Offensive Coordinator Mike Martz would go up against his former team. Detroit fell behind early, as kicker Jeff Wilkins nailed a 42-yard and a 19-yard field goal to give the Rams an early lead. The Lions would get a field goal of their own, as kicker Jason Hanson got a 29-yard field goal. However, before the end of the period, St. Louis increased their lead with QB Marc Bulger completing a 16-yard TD pass to rookie TE Joe Klopfenstein. In the second quarter, Detroit would start to rally, as QB Jon Kitna and WR Mike Furrey connected on two touchdown passes (a 1-yarder and a 10-yarder). The Rams would trail by 1 at halftime, as Wilkins got a 46-yard field goal to end the half as the score was 17 to 16 Lions. In the third quarter, the points continued to climb, St. Louis would regain the lead with Bulger completing a 16-yard TD pass to WR Torry Holt. The Lions would respond with Hanson getting a 20-yard field goal and RB Kevin Jones running 35 yards for a touchdown. However, RB Steven Jackson would help the Rams respond with a 1-yard TD run. In the fourth quarter, Detroit would score again as Jones got a 7-yard TD run. That would be as far as the Lions would get in the game, as the Rams scored 10 unanswered points to end the game, as Wilkins nailed a 47-yard field goal, and Bulger connected with WR Isaac Bruce on a 5-yard TD pass. With their loss, the Lions fell to 0–4.

Week 5: at Minnesota Vikings

at Hubert H. Humphrey Metrodome, Minneapolis, Minnesota

Still looking for their first win, the Lions flew to the Hubert H. Humphrey Metrodome for Week 5, as they played an NFC North match-up with the Minnesota Vikings. The Lions started off with a small deficit as Vikings kicker Ryan Longwell kicked a 26-yard field goal for the only score of the first quarter. In the second quarter, Detroit started to show some offensive dominance, as QB Jon Kitna ran 8 yards for a touchdown, while kicker Jason Hanson kicked a 53-yard field goal. In the third quarter, the Lions seemed to wrap up the victory as TE Dan Campbell caught a 12-yard TD pass for the only score of the period. The Lions fell apart in the fourth quarter, as Vikings QB Brad Johnson completed a 3-yard TD pass to WR Travis Taylor, Vikings LB Ben Leber recovered a fumble in Detroit’s endzone for a touchdown, Longwell kicked a 20-yard field goal, and OLB E.J. Henderson returned an interception 45 yards for a touchdown. With their heart-breaking loss, the Lions dropped to 0–5 on the year.

Week 6: vs. Buffalo Bills

at Ford Field, Detroit, Michigan

Still searching for their first win, the Lions returned home for a Week 6 match-up with the Buffalo Bills. In the first quarter, Detroit got off to a good start with kicker Jason Hanson kicking a 43-yard field goal and RB Kevin Jones getting a 7-yard TD run. In the second quarter, Buffalo started to catch up with QB J. P. Losman completing a 44-yard TD pass to WR Roscoe Parrish. Fortunately, the Lions responded with QB Jon Kitna throwing a 28-yard pass to WR Roy Williams. The Bills would get a 53-yard field goal by kicker Rian Lindell as time ran out on the half. After a scoreless third quarter, Hanson helped Detroit increase their lead with a 29-yard field goal. The Bills would get one last touchdown, as Losman completed a 4-yard TD pass to TE Ryan Neufeld. The Lions held on to finally acquire their first win of the year improving to 1–5.

Week 7: at New York Jets

at Giants Stadium, East Rutherford, New Jersey

Hoping to build on their win over the Bills, the Lions flew to The Meadowlands and took on the New York Jets. From the get-go, Detroit trailed early as N.Y. RB Leon Washington got a 5-yard TD run, while QB Chad Pennington completed a 44-yard TD pass to WR Justin McCareins. In the second quarter, the Lions got on the board with QB Jon Kitna completing a 22-yard TD pass to WR Roy Williams. However, the Jets responded with RB Kevan Barlow running three yards for a touchdown. In the third quarter, New York continued to fly high as kicker Mike Nugent completed a 33-yard field goal. Even though Detroit would get another touchdown, with Kitna completing a 9-yard TD pass to RB Kevin Jones, the "Gang Green" would finish off the Lions with Washington’s 16-yard TD run. With the loss, Detroit heads into its Bye Week at 1–6.

Week 9: vs. Atlanta Falcons

at Ford Field, Detroit, Michigan

Coming off their Bye Week, the Lions were at home for Week 9 as they faced the Atlanta Falcons. In the first quarter, the Lions got off to a fast start, as kicker Jason Hanson nailed a 28-yard field goal, while RB Kevin Jones ran 35 yards for a touchdown. Atlanta would reply with QB Michael Vick completing a 19-yard TD pass to TE Alge Crumpler. In the second quarter, Jones would get a 2-yard TD run for Detroit, while Falcons RB Warrick Dunn got a 1-yard TD run. In the third quarter, the Lions would start to gain huge momentum as Hanson nailed a 19-yard field goal. In the fourth quarter, Detroit put the game away with QB Jon Kitna completing a 60-yard TD pass to WR Roy Williams and Hanson kicking a 36-yard field goal. With the amazing upset victory, the Lions improved to 2–6.

Week 10: vs. San Francisco 49ers

at Ford Field, Detroit, Michigan

Hoping to build on their win over the Falcons, the Lions stayed at home for their match-up against the San Francisco 49ers. In the first quarter, the Lions trailed as Niners RB Frank Gore got a 61-yard TD run, while kicker Joe Nedney got a 28-yard field goal. In the second quarter, Nedmey helped San Francisco get a 23-yard field goal, while Lions kicker Jason Hanson got a 25-yard field goal. In the third quarter, Nedney gave the 49ers a 23-yard field goal, while Lions QB Jon Kitna threw an 8-yard TD pass to TE Dan Campbell. In the fourth quarter, Nedney helped the Niners get a 47-yard field goal, while the Lions could only get a 33-yard field goal by Hanson. With the loss, the Lions fell to 2–7.

Week 11: at Arizona Cardinals

at University of Phoenix Stadium, Glendale, Arizona

Hoping to shake off their home loss to 49ers, the Lions traveled to the University of Phoenix Stadium for a match-up with the Arizona Cardinals. After a scoreless first quarter, the Lions trailed early as QB Matt Leinart hooked up with WR Bryant Johnson on a 2-yard TD pass, while kicker Neil Rackers kicked a 36-yard field goal. In the third quarter, things got more complicated for Detroit as Leinart ran the ball in on a 9-yard TD run. The Lions would finally get on the board with kicker Jason Hanson nailing a 32-yard field goal. In the fourth quarter, even though Detroit would get a 2-yard TD run by RB Arlen Harris, Arizona’s defense held the Lions long enough for the win. With the loss, Detroit would fall to 2–8.

Week 12: vs. Miami Dolphins

at Ford Field, Detroit, Michigan

Trying to snap their two-game losing streak, the Lions went home for their match-up against the Miami Dolphins in the annual Thanksgiving Day game. In the first quarter, the Lions started off strong with QB Jon Kitna completing a 2-yard TD pass to TE Dan Campbell, while kicker Jason Hanson nailed a 52-yard field goal. The Dolphins would respond with QB Joey Harrington (who formerly played for the Lions) threw his first Thanksgiving Day TD pass in the form of an 8-yard TD pass to WR Marty Booker. From there, Miami took control for the rest of the game. In the second quarter, Harrington would throw a 5-yard TD pass to TE Randy McMichael for the only score of the period. In the third quarter, kicker Olindo Mare would nail a 42-yard field goal, while Harrington and Booker hooked up with each other again on a 19-yard TD pass. In the fourth quarter, Mare would kick a 28-yard field goal for the only score of the period, while the Dolphin defense ended up shutting down Detroit’s offense. With the loss, the Lions ended up at 2–9.

The game also featured a “Super Bowl”-esque halftime show featuring John Fogerty, who also performed at the Denver Broncos/Kansas City Chiefs game.

Week 13: at New England Patriots

at Gillette Stadium, Foxboro, Massachusetts

Trying to snap their three-game losing streak, the Lions flew to Gillette Stadium for a Week 13 fight with the New England Patriots. In the first quarter, Detroit trailed early as kicker Stephen Gostkowski nailed a 25-yard field goal for the only score of the period. In the second quarter, the Lions took the lead with QB Jon Kitna completing a 5-yard TD pass to WR Mike Furrey, while kicker Jason Hanson got a 29-yard field goal. However, New England would reclaim the lead with RB Corey Dillon’s 6-yard TD run and Gostkowski’s 27-yard field goal. In the third quarter, Detroit came right back with Hanson’s 38-yard and 49-yard field goal, while DE Jared DeVries sacked Pats QB Tom Brady in his endzone for a safety. In the fourth quarter, Hanson would kick a 26-yard field goal. However, their lead would vanish for good, as Dillon got a 2-yard TD run, which was followed up with Brady successfully completing a 2-point conversion pass to WR Troy Brown. Dillon would then wrap the game up with a 4-yard TD run. With their fourth-straight loss, the Lions fell to 2–10.

Week 14: vs. Minnesota Vikings

at Ford Field, Detroit, Michigan

Trying to snap a four-game skid, the Lions went home for an NFC North rematch with the Minnesota Vikings. In the first quarter, the Lions trailed as Vikings RB Artose Pinner (a former Lion) got a 3-yard and a 4-yard TD run. In the second quarter, Detroit’s struggles continued as Vikes QB Brad Johnson got a 3-yard TD run, yet the 2-point conversion failed. Afterwards, the Lions finally got on the board with DB Jamar Fletcher returning an interception 88 yards for a touchdown, while kicker Jason Hanson nailed a 53-yard field goal. In the third quarter, Detroit held Minnesota to a 30-yard field goal by kicker Ryan Longwell, while Hanson kicked a 45-yard field goal. In the fourth quarter, Pinner wrapped things up for the Vikings with a 1-yard TD run. Even though the Lions would get a touchdown, from QB Jon Kitna’s 23-yard strike to RB Kevin Jones, Detroit was plagued with 6 turnovers. They pulled within 10 in the 4th qtr and had a fourth and goal with less than four minutes to play. Needing two scores, inexplicably the Lions went for a touchdown and failed, thus killing any hope for a last minute victory. With their fifth-straight loss, the Lions fell to 2–11.

Week 15: at Green Bay Packers

at Lambeau Field, Green Bay, Wisconsin

Still looking for their first road win of 2006 and trying to break a now five-game losing streak, the Lions went to Wisconsin to take on the Green Bay Packers. After the teams traded first-quarter field goals, the Packers took a 10–3 halftime lead thanks to a 14-yard TD run by Vernand Morency. Detroit closed to within a point with two more Jason Hanson field goals, but the Packers settled matters with another touchdown run by Morency, this one from 21 yards out with less than three minutes remaining. Packers quarterback Brett Favre broke Dan Marino’s career completions record during the contest, but also threw three interceptions. The Lions fell to 2–12 on the season, 0–7 away from Ford Field.

Week 16: vs. Chicago Bears

at Ford Field, Detroit, Michigan

Trying to snap a six-game losing skid, the Lions returned home for an NFC North rematch the-now 2-time NFC North champion Chicago Bears. In the first quarter, the Bears struck first with kicker Robbie Gould nailing a 36-yard field goal. Afterwards, the Lions took the lead with QB Jon Kitna completing a 23-yard TD pass to TE Dan Campbell. In the second quarter, Chicago bounced back with QB Rex Grossman completing a 13-yard TD pass to WR Bernard Berrian. Afterwards, RB Adrian Peterson got a 2-yard TD run. In the third quarter, Detroit retook the lead with Kitna completing a 20-yard TD pass to WR Mike Furrey and a 2-yard TD pass to WR Roy Williams. However, in the fourth quarter, the inconsistency that continues to plague the Lions showed as the Bears won with Gould getting a 36-yard field goal, a 39-yard field goal, and a 44-yard field goal and on a dropped pass by Mike Williams in the endzone on the last play of the game. With their seventh-straight loss, the Lions fell to 2–13 as they were swept by their division rivals.

Week 17: at Dallas Cowboys

at Texas Stadium, Irving, Texas

Trying to end their season on a high note, the Lions played their last game of the year at Texas Stadium against the Dallas Cowboys, where Detroit won 39–31. Jon Kitna threw four touchdown passes. An impressive last-second comeback drive by the Cowboys saw Dallas QB Tony Romo be denied of what could have been the tying score, as he attempted to scramble into the end zone, but was tackled at the Detroit 2. The Lions finished 3–13 on the season, finishing ahead of only the Oakland Raiders, who finished 2–14, and received the second overall pick in the 2007 NFL Draft. They later used this pick on Calvin Johnson, Wide Receiver of the Georgia Institute of Technology.

References

Detroit Lions on Pro Football Reference

Detroit
Detroit Lions seasons
Detroit Lions